Markeli Point (‘Nos Markeli’ \'nos mar-'ke-li\) is a point on the northwest coast of Smith Island in the South Shetland Islands, Antarctica, projecting 1.2 km west-southwestwards into Drake Passage.  Situated on the north side of the entrance to Cabut Cove 14.5 km southwest of Cape Smith, 2 km south-southwest of Gregory Point and 19.8 km north-northeast of Cape James.  Bulgarian early mapping in 2009.  Named after the medieval fortress of Markeli in southeastern Bulgaria.

References
 Bulgarian Antarctic Gazetteer. Antarctic Place-names Commission. (details in Bulgarian, basic data in English)
 Markeli Point. SCAR Composite Antarctic Gazetteer

External links
 Markeli Point. Copernix satellite image

Headlands of Smith Island (South Shetland Islands)
Bulgaria and the Antarctic